Joseph Schember (born November 13, 1950) is an American banker and politician and serving as the 48th mayor of Erie, Pennsylvania. Schember previously served as a vice president of PNC Bank and as a member of the Erie City Council between 2006 and 2012.

On November 7, 2017, the people of Erie voted for the next Mayor and Schember won 53% of the vote to his Republican challenger John Persinger who gained 47% of the vote. The previous Mayor, Joseph E. Sinnott, served for 3 consecutive terms from 2006 to 2018 and ran unopposed in the latest election. Erie was at a decisive moment in its history as under Sinnott, Erie was kept out of Act 47 which is reserved for financially distressed cities.

Early life and education 
Joseph Schember was born on November 13, 1950, to the parents of Joseph and Helene Flatley Schember. He has two sisters, Mary Anne and Helene who is a Rocket Scientist with a Ph.D. in Fluid Mechanics from Cal Tech. In his youth, he attended Catholic School and studied to become a Priest. He left seminary to complete his degree at Gannon University where he met his wife, Rhonda Mahoney. Schember then received a Master's Degree in English at the University of Dayton and taught at Elk County Christian in St. Mary's, Pennsylvania.

Career 
He worked for PNC Bank for 40 years, starting as a teller and rising up to the level of Regional Manager of 51 branches for PNC in Northwestern Pennsylvania.

Erie city council, 2006–2012 
Schember served on City Council for six years, and was appointed as chairman of the Finance Committee in 2007. During his tenure, he oversaw the city of Erie move from a bleak financial state of a $12.7 million deficit in the General Fund in late 2005 to a $5 million surplus by 2012. In 2009 and in 2010, the City Council appointed Schember to be president of the City Council.

During the Citizens To Be Heard segment of the City Council Meetings, a local activist named Randy Barnes, who was president of an environmental group called Keep Erie's Environment Protected (K.E.E.P.), would continually lodge a conflict of interest complaint against Schember because he had employment with PNC Bank which was doing business with the city of Erie. In response to Randy Barnes complaints that he would lodge at each City Council meeting, Schember resigned May 8, 2012 with a letter that stated that he was "troubled by the lack of civility and unprofessionalism that has infected the Citizens To Be Heard segment of City Council Meetings."

Erie mayoral election, 2017 
Out of nine candidates running in the primary race for mayor, two remained in the run-up to the election: Democrat Joe Schember and Republican John Persinger. Republican nominee John Persinger eventually garnering 47% of the popular vote. Persinger emphasized eliminating blight with a campaign promise of "1,000 in 1,000 Days" initiative to remove 1,000 blightened properties in his first 1,000 days in office. He emphasized the role of broken windows theory, and said that if Erie is to prosper, Erie would need to address blight quickly.

Mayor of Erie 
Schember has initiated many changes to the mayoral governance of Erie since being elected into office. He wants to upgrade the technology of Erie, redesign the city of Erie's website, and hire a new digital media coordinator to focus on getting the city up to date with social media which under Sinnott's long mayoralty it lagged behind. 
Schember hired Erie's first full-time grant writer, Abby Skinner, to work on helping Erie access grant funding from the local, state and federal level. One of Schember's priorities is Erie Refocused, which is part of Erie's Comprehensive Plan to improve the city's economy and society. Skinner will focus on writing grants that will help Erie Refocused move forward.

References

External links
City of Erie Official Website
City of Erie: Biography of Joseph Schember
Joe Schember on Facebook 
Joe Schember on Twitter

1950 births
Living people
Mayors of Erie, Pennsylvania
Pennsylvania Democrats
Gannon University alumni
University of Dayton alumni